Holway is a town in Taylor County, Wisconsin, United States. The population was 854 at the 2000 census.

Geography
According to the United States Census Bureau, the town has a total area of 36.4 square miles (94.2 km2), of which, 36.3 square miles (94.1 km2) of it is land and 0.03% is water.

History
The six mile (10 km) square that would become Holway was first surveyed in the summer of 1847 by a crew working for the U.S. government. Then in 1854 another crew marked all the section corners in the township, walking through the woods and swamps, measuring with chain and compass. When done, the deputy surveyor filed this general description:
The Surface of this Township is generally level the dry land is but very little elevated above the Swamps the Soil is poor 3rd rate bearing but little vegetation but is generally covered with a thick heavy moss. The Timber is principally Hemlock & Birch with a few Scattering trees of White Pine of poor quality. The Township is well watered by numerous Small Streams of good pure water. There are no Settlers in the Township.
The town was named for Nymphus B. Holway, a wealthy lumberman from Maine.

Demographics
As of the census of 2000, there were 854 people, 263 households, and 213 families residing in the town. The population density was 23.5 people per square mile (9.1/km2). There were 284 housing units at an average density of 7.8 per square mile (3.0/km2). The racial makeup of the town was 99.77% White, 0.12% Native American, and 0.12% from two or more races. Hispanic or Latino of any race were 0.12% of the population.

There were 263 households, out of which 42.2% had children under the age of 18 living with them, 67.7% were married couples living together, 6.5% had a female householder with no husband present, and 19.0% were non-families. 16.7% of all households were made up of individuals, and 7.2% had someone living alone who was 65 years of age or older. The average household size was 3.25 and the average family size was 3.71.

In the town, the population was spread out, with 32.4% under the age of 18, 10.9% from 18 to 24, 30.7% from 25 to 44, 17.3% from 45 to 64, and 8.7% who were 65 years of age or older. The median age was 30 years. For every 100 females, there were 106.3 males. For every 100 females age 18 and over, there were 106.8 males.

The median income for a household in the town was $37,500, and the median income for a family was $44,464. Males had a median income of $27,333 versus $23,472 for females. The per capita income for the town was $13,718. About 14.9% of families and 20.8% of the population were below the poverty line, including 23.3% of those under age 18 and 25.0% of those age 65 or over.

References

Towns in Taylor County, Wisconsin
Towns in Wisconsin